"You're a Heartbreaker" is a song recorded by Elvis Presley in December 1954 during the fourth of Presley's now-legendary eight sessions at Memphis' Sun Studio. The recording was released as the B-side of Presley's third single on the Sun label (Sun 215), whose A-side was a cover of Kokomo Arnold's "Milkcow Blues Boogie".

Session
The song was recorded "November or December, 1954" with personnel:
 Elvis Presley - lead vocals, acoustic rhythm guitar
 Scotty Moore - lead guitar
 Bill Black - double bass

The single was reissued on RCA Victor records (47-6382).  It is listed as 2:10 minutes long, with the publisher Hill & Range BMI. It was also later included on Elvis' seventh studio album, For LP Fans Only in 1959.

References

Elvis Presley songs
Song recordings produced by Sam Phillips
1954 songs